Altissimo (Italian for very high) is the uppermost register on woodwind instruments. For clarinets, which overblow on odd harmonics, the altissimo notes are those based on the fifth, seventh, and higher harmonics. For other woodwinds, the altissimo notes are those based on the third, fourth, and higher harmonics. The altissimo register is also known as the high register.

Flute, oboe, clarinet, and bassoon
On the Boehm system flute, the first altissimo note, D6, is played using the third harmonic of G4. Fourth harmonics are used for D6 through G6, and notes from A6 through C7 are played with fifth or sixth harmonics.

A careful examination of the flute fingering for the notes D6 through G6 reveals that they are actually a combination of third and fourth harmonic fingerings. For example, the D fingering is like the low D4 with the addition of the G key vented, for which D6 is the third harmonic.  Similarly, in the third octave, the E is a combination of E and A fingerings, the F is a combination of F and B, et cetera.

On the oboe, third harmonics are mainly used.

On clarinets, fifth harmonics are used for the first half dozen notes above (written) C6; seventh and ninth harmonics are used beyond that.

For bassoons, the altissimo notes bear complicated harmonic relationships to the fundamental register.

Saxophone

Saxophone altissimo is generally considered to be any note that is higher than written high F, which is considered the highest note in the saxophone's regular range. Altissimo is produced by the player using various voicing techniques such as air stream, tongue, throat and embouchure variations to disturb the fundamental of a note, which results in one of the higher overtones dominating.

In classical music, altissimo playing is considered a necessary skill for saxophonists, and much of the modern concert saxophone repertoire utilizes the altissimo range. A notable proponent of the altissimo range was Sigurd Raschèr, who preferred the term top tones.  Raschèr is the author of Top Tones For the Saxophone, which is the most widely used and known method book for training saxophonists to perform in the upper and altissimo register of the saxophone.

In jazz music, use of altissimo is common, especially among avant-garde players, though one of its earliest practitioners was the swing player Earl Bostic. Altissimo technique and the use of multiphonics are prominent in the influential work of Eric Dolphy and John Coltrane during the 1960s, as well as in the work of Lenny Pickett, Ron Holloway, Scott Page, Michael Brecker and Chris Potter.

Low note overtones are similar to altissimo but mostly result in a lower pitch than written high F.
For example, it is possible to use a low B fingering to produce a series of higher overtones by using air stream, tongue, throat and embouchure variations.

The more difficult task of producing a complete chromatic scale in the altissimo register should not be confused with squeals and other sound effects that are produced by biting on the reed with the lower teeth.

References
 (republication of third edition, 1967, as reprinted with corrections, 1977)

Musical techniques